Packera werneriifolia, known by the common names alpine rock butterweed and hoary groundsel, is a species of flowering plant in the aster family. It is native to the western United States in the Sierra Nevada mountain habitat in subalpine and alpine climates, including forests and barren talus.

Description
It is a perennial herb which is usually small but is otherwise variable in appearance. It grows up to about 15 centimeters tall from a basal rosette of thick, linear or oval leaves a few centimeters long; leaf morphology varies from the western to the eastern regions of the plant's range. The basal leaves are woolly, white to greenish and tufted with smooth and nearly entire (smooth edged) leaf margins and multiple , nearly leafless stems bearing 1-6 flower heads.

The inflorescence bears a single flower head or a cluster of a few heads and may be nearly hairless to quite woolly. The flower head contains up to 40 yellow disc florets, and usually either 8 or 13 yellow ray florets, though these are sometimes absent. It blooms in July to August.

Habitat and range

References

External links
Jepson Manual Treatment of Packera werneriifolia
USDA Plants Profile for Packera werneriifolia
Flora of North America
Southwest Colorado Wildflowers
UC CalPhotos gallery of Packera werneriifolia

werneriifolia
Alpine flora
Flora of the Western United States
Flora of California
Flora of Colorado
Flora of the Sierra Nevada (United States)
Flora of the Rocky Mountains
Taxa named by Asa Gray
Flora without expected TNC conservation status